William Broom (26 February 1895 – 5 January 1971) was an English professional footballer who played as an inside forward.

References

1895 births
1971 deaths
Footballers from Grimsby
English footballers
Association football inside forwards
Brigg Town F.C. players
Grimsby Town F.C. players
English Football League players